Hastings Point is a town located in north-eastern New South Wales, Australia, in the Tweed Shire. From 1947 to 1962 aerial photography revealed foredunes up to 16 metres high in the area that had reduced to six to nine metres high by 1977.

Demographics

The median age of the Hastings Point population was 62 years, 25 years above the national median of 37.

77.8% of people living in Hastings Point were born in Australia. The other top responses for country of birth were England 8.1%, New Zealand 3.6%, Scotland 2.1%, Finland 0.7%, Germany 0.7%.

92.1% of people spoke only English at home; the next most common languages were 0.5% Finnish, 0.5% German, 0.5% Balinese, 0.5% Italian.

References 

Suburbs of Tweed Heads, New South Wales
Coastal towns in New South Wales